Chowhound (or chowhound.com) was a food website owned by Red Ventures. It ceased operations on March 28, 2022.

History 
Chowhound was a popular online food community founded by jazz trombonist and food writer Jim Leff and Bob Okumura in 1997, known for its user base of food fanatics. Chowhound was formed in a very different cultural era, before Americans had a mainstream interest in seeking out regional delicacies and local favorites.  As such, Chowhound served a very particular user base that was seeking delicious, regional and hard to find foods outside of the mainstream culture. It had an early influence in steering America's influence towards regional delicacies, as the future trailblazing food critics Jonathan Gold and Robert Sietsema were early contributors. In 2006, Leff and Okumura sold the site to CNET Networks, which redesigned it and merged it with CHOW magazine, keeping its busy forums, grouped by locale. After CNET was merged into CBS Interactive in 2008, the original chowhound.com domain was restored and CHOW was eliminated. It was bought by Red Ventures, in 2020.

In March, 2022, Red Ventures announced the site would close after 25 years online. Its closure was covered by the New York Times, among other media.

Book series 
Penguin USA published two Chowhound restaurant guides, The Chowhound's Guide to the San Francisco Bay Area, and The Chowhound's Guide to the New York Tristate Area.

See also
 List of websites about food and drink

References

 Boston Globe article on Chowhound redesign

Village Voice article on Chowhound sale
New York Times article on Chowhound sale to CNET
Newsweek article on Chowhound
New York Times article on Chowhound
Forbes Magazine article on Chowhound
People Magazine article on Chowhound

External links
 

Former CBS Interactive websites
Internet properties established in 1997
Websites about food and drink
Red Ventures
2020 mergers and acquisitions
Internet properties disestablished in 2022